Last of the Badmen is a 1957 American CinemaScope Western film directed by Paul Landres and starring George Montgomery.

Plot

Cast
George Montgomery as Dan Barton
James Best as Ted Hamilton
Douglas Kennedy as Hawkins
Keith Larsen as Roberts
Robert Foulk as Tom Taylor
Willis Bouchey as Marshal Parker
John Doucette as Johnson
Meg Randall as Lila
Tom Greenway as Dallas
Addison Richards as Dillon
Michael Ansara as Jess Kramer
John Damler as Elkins

Production
The film was known as 54 Washington Street. Filming started June 1956.

References

External links

Last of the Badmen at IMDb
Last of the Badmen at TCMDB

1957 films
1957 Western (genre) films
Allied Artists films
CinemaScope films
American Western (genre) films
Films directed by Paul Landres
1950s English-language films
1950s American films